Dominic Foppoli, (May 22, 1982) is an American politician, accused serial rapist, and businessperson. He is the former Mayor of Windsor, California, a position he held from December 2018 until May 2021. Between April and May 2021, numerous women made sexual abuse and assault allegations against Foppoli dating back to 2002. Foppoli, who denies wrongdoing, is currently under investigation by the Attorney General of California. He is also under investigation for possible campaign finance violations by the California Fair Political Practices Commission. Foppoli refused to resign from office, causing a recall campaign to be launched in April 2021. Foppoli resigned from office on May 21, 2021. In August 2021, Foppoli filed paperwork with intent to run for Mayor of Windsor for the November 2022 election.

Early life and education

Foppoli is of Italian heritage. His family is from Tovo di Sant'Agata in Lombardy. His great-grandfather moved from Italy to the United States over 100 years ago. Foppoli was born and raised in Sonoma County, California, living mainly in the Windsor, California community for his adult life. Foppoli has three siblings. As a child, he worked as a busboy at a family-owned restaurant. At age sixteen, he worked at Windsor Waterworks.

He graduated from Cardinal Newman High School in 2000. In 2002, Foppoli briefly lived in Los Angeles where he pursued a career in acting. He attended Dominican University, where he was a member of the Young Republicans club. He graduated from Dominican with a bachelor's degree in politics in 2005. He moved back to Windsor that year. He lived with a group of friends in a house in Windsor and was eventually kicked out of the house for "consistent lack of respect for people's stuff" and holding house parties regularly at the house to the dismay of his roommates. Foppoli completed his Master of Business Administration with a concentration on wine business from Sonoma State University.

Career

Foppoli works for three wineries, all owned and operated by the Foppoli family. As of April 1, he served as general manager at Foppoli Wines, president of Benevelo Wines. He also co-owns Christopher Creek Winery. Foppoli's family has been involved in the wine industry since 1906, when his grandfather emigrated from Italy to California and started making wine. Foppoli has also worked in real estate and operated a wine export business, the latter operated with his older brother. He was named one of North Bay Business Journal's "Forty Under 40" for his work in the wine industry.

Foppoli, his siblings, and other partners, purchased Christopher Creek winery in 2012. That same year, he opened Old Redwood Brewing Co., in Windsor, with several partners. In 2018, Foppoli and brewery business partner Clay Fritz, entered into a partnership with Jean-Charles Boisset to reopen the brewery as Windsor Brewing Co. The new brewery never opened. In 2020, Foppoli invested in Whitestar Security Group, a Santa Rosa-based security firm. The company stopped operations in 2021 after losing lucrative contracts following accusations against Foppoli of sexual assault and harassment. Foppoli also served as chief executive officer of Christopher Creek Winery until he was asked to step down by his brother in the wake of sexual assault and abuse allegations in April 2021.

Politics

In 2003, Foppoli announced his candidacy for California State Assembly. His campaign website featured him shaking hands with Arnold Schwarzenegger. Foppoli ran in the primary against rancher Ray Tyrone. During the election, Foppoli's campaign promoted numerous unfounded claims about Tyrone, including operating an illegal bar in Cloverdale, theft, and clearcutting. Foppoli lost the Republican primary.

The following year, he attended the 2004 Republican National Convention as a delegate for the state of California and, in 2005, he was named second vice chairman of the Sonoma County Republican Party's executive committee. He was the youngest person to ever hold the position.

While attending Dominican University, Foppoli became involved in the Marin County Republican Party and the university's Young Republicans club. He helped the County party raise funds, promote get out the vote efforts, and maintain its office in 2004 and 2005. On his resumé, Foppoli described himself as the executive director of the Marin County party, even though it was later confirmed by The Windsor Times that such a position did not exist and Foppoli's work was voluntary. Foppoli was an intern at the White House during the George W. Bush presidency from October to December 2005.

Foppoli ran for Windsor Town Council in 2006. His platform included being a self-described "environmental conservative", implementing a parcel tax, improving public safety, and business growth. He raised more money than any other candidate, $19,005 by October 2006, including $10,000 donated by Foppoli himself. During the election, Foppoli's qualifications were questioned by the Sonoma West Times & News. He claimed he was a policy analyst and advisor for the Bush administration; that he served on a gang task force in the White House; was a liaison between the White House and local governments; and that he promoted California wine in Mexico for the administration - all over the course of three to six months. He also claimed he was a staff member because he had his own office and security badge. It was confirmed with the White House Office that Foppoli was an intern for two months. When asked why he exaggerated his work in the Marin County Republican Party and at the White House, Foppoli blamed "youthful enthusiasm." Foppoli did not win the Windsor Town Council election that year.

Windsor Town Council and Mayor

Foppoli was appointed to the Windsor, California Planning Commission in 2013. The following year, on November 4, 2014, he was elected to the Windsor Town Council. At 32 years old, he was the youngest council member ever elected in the Town. He won with 25.5% of the vote out of a line up of five candidates.

In 2016, he expressed interest in becoming mayor to fellow councilmember Bruce Okrepkie. He said he wanted to become mayor before attending the Republican National Convention in Indianapolis, so he could promote that he was a mayor and not just a councilmember. He was not mayor at that time. While in Indianapolis, Foppoli boasted on social media about having dinner with Rudy Giuliani during the convention. He was later appointed vice mayor in 2016. He also left the Republican party and became a Democrat.

Foppoli was set to become mayor in 2017. However, the council decided to postpone its decision until 2018 after accusations of drunken and harassing behavior by Foppoli arose via an email sent to then Windsor Mayor, Debora Fudge, in November 2017.

He won re-election to the town council in November 2018 and was appointed to a two-year term as mayor of Windsor by his fellow town councilmembers on December 5, 2018.

He attended the California Democratic Party State Convention in 2019. Months later, during the Kincade Fire, Foppoli slept in his car at the emergency operations center as the fire threatened Windsor. He met with Governor Gavin Newsom and State Senator Bill Dodd during the fire and participated in numerous press conferences. During the fire, a batch of beer at Russian River Brewing Company was going to be spoiled. Foppoli gathered the National Guard, who had been gathered in Windsor to help with the wildfire, to help save the beer. His response to the wildfire was praised by his fellow councilmembers, who endorsed him again as mayor in 2020.

During the COVID-19 pandemic, Foppoli co-starred on a web series called "Meals with the Mayor(s)" with Guy Fieri. They interviewed local restaurants about how businesses responded to the statewide stay-at-home order. Foppoli also held numerous parties at his house and at Christopher Creek Winery during the pandemic, breaking state and county stay-at-home mandates. In November 2020, Windsor held its first election for mayor. He won a two-year term. He was also elected second vice president of the Mayors and Council Members Department at the League of California Cities.

In April 2021, Foppoli was appointed to represent Sonoma County on the Board of Directors of the Golden Gate Bridge, Highway and Transportation District. That same month, Foppoli was accused of sexual assault, rape and harassment by numerous women. He was removed from his newly appointed position and also removed as second vice president of the Mayors and Council Members Department at the League of California Cities. Despite calls for Foppoli to resign from the public and a recall campaign being launched, he refused, and announced he would instead "step down" from his role as mayor, while still maintaining the title. He was not allowed to visit Windsor Town Hall without receiving the permission of the town manager. Foppoli resigned from office on May 21, 2021, after Farrah Abraham accused him of sexual assault.

As of May 2021, the California Fair Political Practices Commission is investigating claims that Foppoli used political campaign expenses to pay for personal expenditures between 2014 and 2020. The investigation is based on an April 26, 2021 complaint filed with the Commission. The complaint comprises nine claims, including Foppoli spending over $580 worth of bourbon and vodka for his own birthday party; payments made to his then girlfriend, Amy Holter, who worked on his campaign; payments made to a Christopher Creek employee who also served as his campaign treasurer; a "civic donation" to a Sonoma County-based nonprofit that supports rural schools in Kenya; and travel costs. Months later, in August 2021, Foppoli filed paperwork with the Town of Windsor with intent to run for Mayor of the town in the November 2022 election.

Accused sexual crimes

Accused crimes
On April 8, 2021, San Francisco Chronicle journalists Alexandria Bordas and Cynthia Dizikes reported about four women accusing Foppoli of sexually harassing, assaulting, or raping them. In subsequent weeks, additional accusations were publicly made by other women in local media and at an emergency Windsor Town Council meeting. The incidents date from 2001 to 2021.

The women who have accused Foppoli of sexual harassment or assault include:

An unnamed woman told the San Francisco Chronicle that Foppoli raped her twice, including once at a party after pressuring her to drink too much alcohol in 2003.
Sophia Williams split a cab with Foppoli after an evening out with friends at a nightclub in 2006. Instead, of dropping her off at her house, Foppoli told the taxi driver to bring her to Foppoli's house where he sexually assaulted her. 

Allison Britton attended an Active 20-30 Club conference in 2012 in Reno, Nevada. After Britton became intoxicated, Foppoli offered to walk her back to her hotel room. Instead, he took her to his hotel room and forced her to perform oral sex on him. 
Rose Fumoso, a former winery intern, met Foppoli at a party at Christopher Creek Winery in 2019. Foppoli offered to show Fumoso his Tesla car. He proceeded to drive her to an unfamiliar house where he sexually assaulted her.
Shannon McCarthy had a three-year relationship with Foppoli. During their time together, he forced her to perform oral sex on him multiple times. Once, he shackled her to a bed and sexually abused her.
Carson Davis was sexually assaulted by Foppoli. He grabbed her buttocks.
Esther Lemus, Sonoma County Deputy District Attorney and Windsor Town Councilmember, says Foppoli drugged, sexually assaulted, and raped her twice in 2020. Lemus also claims Foppoli blackmailed her, stating he had compromising videos of Lemus from one of the incidents and he would release the videos if she came forward about the assaults.
Farrah Abraham, reality television star and author, accused Foppoli of sexual battery at a private home in Palm Beach, Florida in March 2021.
Jane, a social worker, rented Christopher Creek Winery's vacation rental in 2017 with a group of friends. Jane sat in a hot tub with her friends and Foppoli. He turned off the lights, exposed his penis, and pushed it into Jane's hands.

Jane sent an email to the Windsor Mayor, Debora Fudge, on November 20, 2017 about Foppoli's behavior at the vacation rental. Foppoli was vice mayor at the time and was anticipated to become mayor in December. Jane accused Foppoli of having a "predatory nature." She described Foppoli's disorderly and harassing behavior at the vacation rental. He invited himself into the house and made two young female winery employees strip off their clothing and wear togas. She shared that Foppoli tried to remove the swimsuit of a guest in the hot tub. He also secretly topped off guests' wineglasses when they weren't looking. Windsor town staff asked Foppoli about the accusation after receiving the letter. He denied he did anything wrong. The Town of Windsor never investigated further. When a second letter accusing Foppoli of sexual assault was sent to the council in early 2020, the council referred Jane's letter and the second letter to the Sonoma County Sheriff.

Additionally, Rachel Hundley, former Mayor of Sonoma, spent the night with Foppoli at a hotel at a conference in Sacramento in 2015. Despite telling him she was not interested in him sexually, Foppoli exposed himself twice to her during the hotel stay. He also took an unsolicited photograph of Hundley the next morning. Hundley did not accuse Foppoli of a crime, only sexual misconduct.

Foppoli's response

In response to the initial San Francisco Chronicle 2021 article, Foppoli's attorney, Bethany Kristovich, released a statement that Foppoli “categorically denies having engaged in any of the abuses described.” An additional portion of the statement reads:

Foppoli declined to be interviewed by the San Francisco Chronicle when asked. Weeks later, at an emergency town council meeting, he said “I know deep in my heart that I have done nothing criminally wrong and eventually will be cleared.”

He has refused to resign despite calls for him to do so. On April 16, 2021, Foppoli announced that he would “step back from an active role as Mayor", that he “will take this time to sit quietly, and reflect on my life," and that “Through prayer and in speaking with residents over the course of this week, it has become clear to me that the Town Council will not function at the level expected by its citizens if I remain actively involved, given the strong reaction to the allegations against me."

Foppoli has also called the accusations "unfounded" and a political effort to "put my head on a spike." When a Farrah Abraham came forward in May 2021, Foppoli described the woman as "making these allegations in an attempt to leverage the situation to her advantage."

Investigation

The Town of Windsor referred the San Francisco Chronicle allegations to the police on April 8, 2021. That same day, the Sonoma County Sheriff, Mark Essick, announced a criminal investigation. On April 13, 2021, the California Attorney General announced they would oversee the investigation in the wake of deputy district attorney Esther Lemus accusing Foppoli of sexual assault and rape. Foppoli's ex-girlfriend Amy Holter and local housing policy advocate Chris Grabill are both participating in the investigation about Lemus' accusations.

On April 30, Lemus' attorneys told the Press Democrat that Foppoli had hired a political operative to leak compromising videos of Lemus to the press. The "operative" turned out to be Trump-era lobbyist Robert Stryk. As a result, Lemus' attorneys sent a cease and desist letter to Foppoli and demanded he turn over any video or related media to the allegations raised by Lemus to law enforcement. 

The Town of Windsor asked the Sonoma County District Attorney to launch a grand jury investigation into Foppoli's “willfull or corrupt misconduct in office," per a letter sent by the Town of Windsor to District Attorney Jill Ravitch on May 6, 2021.

The Sonoma County Sheriff's Department raided Foppoli's Windsor house on November 10, 2021. The Sheriff's Department confiscated 10 items, including laptops, iPads, a camera, a cell phone, USB drive and a recorder. They raid was to discover photographs of two women, one from 2002 and one from 2017 to determine if a felony was committed.

Florida investigation

The Palm Beach Police Department is investigating Foppoli for felony sexual battery of Farrah Abraham. Abraham filed a police report on April 2, 2021. According to Abraham's attorney, the evidence includes video, audio and photographs provided by Abraham. Abraham has also been in touch with the Sonoma County sheriff's department.

Reactions and recall efforts
Calls for Foppoli to resign or be removed from office began immediately after the first San Francisco Chronicle article was published. Foppoli is not up for re-election until November 2022. Politicians calling for Foppoli's resignation include state assemblymember Jim Wood, state senator Mike McGuire and U.S. Congressmember Mike Thompson. Mayors from eight Sonoma County towns and cities released a joint statement calling for Foppoli to resign. Fellow Windsor Town Councilmember, Sonoma County Deputy District Attorney, and Foppoli accuser Esther Lemus, also called for Foppoli to resign.

The Town of Windsor called the allegations "shocking and horrible". An emergency town council meeting was held on April 15, 2021. Foppoli facilitated the meeting, which included hours of public comment about the accusations and with people demanding he resign. Additional women also accused him of sexual assault during the meeting. At the end of the six hour meeting, the town council voted in support of Foppoli resigning. Foppoli voted against the motion.

Foppoli was expelled from the Active 20-30 Club, a civic organization of which he was an active member. He was removed from his position as second vice president of the Mayors and Council Members Department at the League of California Cities. Christopher Creek Winery was removed as a member of Sonoma County Vintners and Russian River Valley Winegrowers. He was also removed from his appointment to the board of directors of the Golden Gate Bridge, Highway and Transportation District.

Various protests have taken place demanding Foppoli to step down from the town council. Windsor community members held a rally on April 9, 2021. Protestors also went to Foppoli's house, where they propped up signs demanding he resign against his house and on his car. An additional protest took place out front of Christopher Creek Winery, where protestors displayed signs demanding Foppoli's resignation.

Foppoli was asked by his brother, Joe Foppoli, to step down as chief executive officer of Christopher Creek Winery and as mayor. Joe Foppoli stated, "Elected officials should be held to higher standards of moral character and no matter what comes out, he has not done that and he needs to step down. This is not good for the community. I'm so disappointed and disgusted." He said that he was in shock over the accusations but would not say if he believed the accusers or not.

On April 26, 2021, the United Residents for Recalling Foppoli Committee filed a "notice of intention" for a recall election with the Windsor city clerk. The North Bay Labor Council AFL–CIO is supported the recall effort. Foppoli resigned on May 21, ending the recall effort.

Personal life

Foppoli is Catholic. He lives in Windsor, California. He also owns a home, which has been in the Foppoli family for years, in Mazzo di Valtellina, Italy. In October 2020, Foppoli tested positive for COVID-19 after a work trip to Tennessee.

Foppoli has appeared on numerous television programs. In 2002, Foppoli appeared with his then girlfriend, Shannon McCarthy, on Meet My Folks. Foppoli was recruited by Bravo to appear on a reality show about dating in 2012. Foppoli filmed two pilot episodes and quit the project. In 2015, Foppoli appeared on The Steve Harvey Show competing for the title of the sexiest man in California. In 2018, he appeared on 48 Hours about the 2015 murder of Emad Tawfilis by vintner Robert Dahl. In the episode, Foppoli was called "the prince of wine country."

References

External links

1982 births
American viticulturists
People from Windsor, California
American people of Italian descent
Dominican University of California alumni
Sonoma State University alumni
21st-century American businesspeople
California Republicans
California Democrats
Mayors of places in California
2021 scandals
Living people
21st-century American politicians